The following is a timeline of the history of the city of Kerman, Iran.

Prior to 20th century

 3rd century CE – Bardašir/Govāšir founded by Ardashir I.
 644 – Muslim conquest of Kerman occurs (approximate date).
 932 – Moḥammad b. Elyās in power.
 1012 – Buyid Qawam al-Dawla in power.
 1041–1072 - Construction of the Masjid i Malik mosque by Malik Kaverd Seljuk.
 1048 – Seljuq Qawurd in power.
 1188 – Seljuqs ousted (approximate date).
 1222 – Amir Buraq Hajib in power.
 1349 – Jameh Mosque of Kerman built.
 1390 – Masjid-i Pa Minar (mosque) built.
 1596 – Ganj Ali Khan becomes governor.
 1598 – Ganjali Caravanserai construction begins.
 1625 – Ganjali Mint built.
 1631 – Ganjali Bathhouse built.
 1660s – Offices of English East India Company and Dutch East India Company in business.
 1758 – Karim Khan in power.
 1794 –  by forces of Agha Mohammad Khan Qajar.
 1801 – Ibrahim Khan becomes governor.
 1875 – Population: 40,228.
 1878 – Firuz Mirzā Farmānfarmā becomes governor.

20th century

 1905 – Balasari and Shaykhi unrest.
 1906 –  established.
 1917 –  (hospital) founded.
 1956 – Population: 62,157.
 1966 – Population: 89,700.
 1969 –  (assembly hall) built.
 1970 – Kerman Airport begins operating.
 1976 – Population: 145,613.
 1978 – .
 1986 – Population: 264,560.
 1996 – Population: 384,991.
 1998 – Sanat Mes Kerman F.C. (football club) formed.

21st century

 2003 – 19 February: Airplane crash occurs near city.
 2006 – Population: 515,114.
 2007 – Shahid Bahonar Stadium opens.
 2011 – Population: 534,441.
 2013 – 14 June: Local election held.
 2014 – City becomes part of newly formed national administrative Region 5.
 2015 – Ali Babayi becomes mayor.

See also
 Kerman history (fa)
 
 Other names of Kerman (city)
 Category:Monuments in Kerman (city; in Persian)
 
 Kerman Province history (fa)
 Timelines of other cities in Iran: Bandar Abbas, Hamadan, Isfahan,  Mashhad, Qom, Shiraz, Tabriz, Tehran, Yazd

References

This article incorporates information from the Persian Wikipedia.

Bibliography

in English
 
 
 
 
 
 
 Paul Ward English, "Cultural Change and the Structure of a Persian City," in Carl Leiden, ed., The Conflict of Traditionalism and Modernism in the Muslim Middle East (Austin: University of Texas Press, 1966), pp. 32–48. 
 Paul W. English, City and Village in Iran: Settlement and Economy in the Kirman Basin (Madison: University of Wisconsin Press, 1968).
 
  via Google Books
 
 
 
 
 
  (Covers circa 1795–1925)

in other languages
  (Written in 17th century)
 
 
 
 
 Heribert Busse. "Kerman im 19. Jahrhundert nach der Geographie des Waziri," Der Islam 50 (1973): 284–312.
  (Written in 17th century CE)
  (Written in 17th century CE; 2 vols)
 Bastani Parizi. "Principes de l'évolution de la tolérance dans l'histoire de Kerman," in A. Harrak, ed., Contacts Between Cultures (Lewiston: Edwin Mellen Press, 1992)

External links

 
  (Bibliography)
 Items related to Kerman, various dates (via Europeana)
 Items related to Kerman, various dates (via Qatar Digital Library) (also "Kirman")

Images

Years in Iran
History of Kerman Province
Kerman
Kerman